İğneciler can refer to:

 İğneciler, Mudurnu
 İğneciler, Ulus